Wila Kunka Pata (Aymara wila blood, blood-red, kunka throat, pata step   "red throat step", also spelled Wila Cunca Pata) is a  mountain in the Bolivian Andes. It is situated in the La Paz Department, Los Andes Province, Pucarani Municipality, west of the Cordillera Real. Wila Kunka Pata lies south-west of the mountain Imilla Apachita and the Kunturiri River.

References 

Mountains of La Paz Department (Bolivia)